Ladduram Kori is an Indian politician from Ashoknagar district in Madhya Pradesh state of Republic of India. He is member of Madhya Pradesh Legislative Assembly during 2008-2013 and elected from Ashoknagar constituency. He is member of Bhartiya Janata Party. He is a resident of Village Belsara Post Rahatha, District Umaria M.P.

References

Living people
People from Ashoknagar
Madhya Pradesh MLAs 2008–2013
Bharatiya Janata Party politicians from Madhya Pradesh
Year of birth missing (living people)